Bald Hill is a hill located on the Hudson Highlands in Dutchess County, New York. The hill is one of two peaks—Lamb's Hill is the other—located on the Fishkill Ridge Trail in Hudson Highlands State Park.

Geology 
Bald Hill is located on the Reading Prong.

References 

Hills of New York (state)
Landforms of Dutchess County, New York